Leonora Josephine "Leonie" Taylor  (March 1870 in Cincinnati, Ohio – March 9, 1936 in Mount Sterling, Kentucky) was an American archer who was a member of the American squad that won the team round gold medals at the 1904 Summer Olympics. Her sister was Mabel Taylor who competed against her at the same games.

References

External links
 

1870 births
1936 deaths
American female archers
Archers at the 1904 Summer Olympics
Olympic gold medalists for the United States in archery
Medalists at the 1904 Summer Olympics
Sportspeople from Ohio